Dr. Joachim Nerz (born 1964) is a German taxonomist and botanist specialising in the carnivorous plant genera Heliamphora and Nepenthes. Nerz has described several new species, mostly with Andreas Wistuba.

Publications
 Schlauer, J. & J. Nerz 1994. Notes on Nepenthes (Nepenthaceae). I. Contributions to the Flora of Sumatra. Blumea 39: 139–142.
 Nerz, J. & A. Wistuba 1994. Five new taxa of Nepenthes (Nepenthaceae) from North and West Sumatra. Carnivorous Plant Newsletter 23(4): 101–114.
 Nerz, J., P. Mann, T. Alt & T. Smith 1998. Nepenthes sibuyanensis, a new Nepenthes from Sibuyan, a remote island of the Philippines. Carnivorous Plant Newsletter 27(1): 18–23.
 Nerz, J. 1998. Rediscovery of an outstanding Nepenthes: N. aristolochioides (Nepenthaceae). Carnivorous Plant Newsletter 27(3): 101–114.
 Nerz, J. & A. Wistuba 2000. Heliamphora hispida (Sarraceniaceae), a new species from Cerro Neblina, Brazil-Venezuela. Carnivorous Plant Newsletter 29(2): 37–41.
 Thiv, M. & J. Nerz 2000. Saccifolium, oder die bemerkenswerte Geschichte einer der seltensten Tepui-Pflanzen. Der Palmengarten 64(1): 11–16.
 Nerz, J. 2004. Heliamphora elongata (Sarraceniaceae), a new species from Ilu-Tepui. Carnivorous Plant Newsletter 33(4): 111–116.
 Wistuba, A., T. Carow, P. Harbarth & J. Nerz 2005. Heliamphora pulchella, eine neue mit Heliamphora minor (Sarraceniaceae) verwandte Art aus der Chimanta Region in Venezuela. Das Taublatt 53(3): 42–50.
 Nerz, J. & A. Wistuba 2006. Heliamphora exappendiculata, a clearly distinct species with unique characteristics. Carnivorous Plant Newsletter 35(2): 43–51.
 Nerz, J., A. Wistuba & G. Hoogenstrijd 2006. Heliamphora glabra (Sarraceniaceae), eine eindrucksvolle Heliamphora Art aus dem westlichen Teil des Guayana Schildes. Das Taublatt 54: 58–70.
 Wistuba, A., J. Nerz & A. Fleischmann 2007. Nepenthes flava, a new species of Nepenthaceae from the northern part of Sumatra. Blumea 52: 159–163.
 Nerz, J. & A. Wistuba 2007. Nepenthes mantalingajanensis (Nepenthaceae), eine bemerkenswerte neue Spezies aus Palawan (Philippinen). Das Taublatt 55(3): 17–25.
 Fleischmann, A., A. Wistuba & J. Nerz. 2009. Three new species of Heliamphora (Sarraceniaceae) from the Guayana Highlands of Venezuela. Willdenowia 39(2): 273–283.

References

External links
Personal homepage

Living people
1964 births
20th-century German botanists
21st-century German botanists